The 1959 New York state election was held on November 3, 1959, to elect the Chief Judge of the New York Court of Appeals.

Background
Chief Judge Albert Conway would reach the constitutional age limit of 70 years at the end of the year.

Nominations
Both Democrats and Republicans nominated Charles S. Desmond, the senior associate judge of the Court of Appeals, to succeed Conway.

Result
Charles Desmond was elected without opposition.

Notes
Desmond's total vote was 4,394,139

Vote totals from New York Red Book 1960

See also
New York state elections

1959
1959
 
New York